{{DISPLAYTITLE:C16H26N2O4}}
The molecular formula C16H26N2O4 (molar mass: 310.39 g/mol, exact mass: 310.1893 u) may refer to:

 Cetamolol
 Pamatolol

Molecular formulas